Castell-Rüdenhausen was a County in the region of Franconia in northern Bavaria of the Holy Roman Empire, ruled by a branch of the Counts of Castell. It was created as a partition of Castell and in 1806, it was mediatised to Bavaria. A branch of the Princely House is the famous noble Faber-Castell family.

Counts of Castell-Rüdenhausen (1597 - 1806)

Godfrey (1597 - 1635)
George Frederick (1635 - 1653)
Philip Godfrey (1653 - 1681)
John Frederick (1681 - 1749)
Frederick Louis (1749 - 1803)
Christian Frederick (previously Count of Castell-Castell) (1803 - 1806)

(Mediatized) Counts of Castell-Rüdenhausen 
 Christian Frederick (1806 - 1850)
 Wolfgang (1850-1901)

(Mediatized) Princes of Castell-Rüdenhausen (1901) 

 Wolfgang, Count 1850–1901, 1st Prince 1901-1913 (1830-1913), m. Emma, Princess of Ysenburg and Büdingen
  Casimir, 2nd Prince 1913-1933 (1861-1933), m. Mechtild, Countess of Bentinck
 Rupert, 3rd Prince 1933-1944 (1910-1944)
  Siegfried, 4th Prince 1944-2007 (1916-2007), m. Irene, Countess of Solms-Laubach
  Johann-Friedrich, 5th Prince 2007-2014 (1948-2014), m. Maria, Countess of Schönborn-Wiesentheid
 Otto, 6th Prince 2014-present (b.1985)
Lelio Johann-Friedrich Theodor (b. October 13, 2020)
  Prince Anton (b.1992)

References 

Counties of the Holy Roman Empire